Louisa Sarah Anne Connolly-Burnham (born 23 June 1992) is an English actress and filmmaker. She is best known for her roles as Shannon Kelly in the CBBC series Wolfblood (2012–2014) and Willow Jenks in the Nickelodeon series House of Anubis (2013). She made her directorial debut with the short film The Call Centre (2020).

Early life
Connolly-Burnham was born in Solihull, West Midlands and grew up in Buckinghamshire with her two brothers. She attended Wycombe High School. Her father enrolled her in Saturday classes at Jackie Palmer Stage School. She went on to train at Arts Educational School, Tring Park.

Career 
Connolly-Burnham made her debut with small roles in the 2007 TV movie Coming Down the Mountain and the crime drama series Midsomer Murders. In 2012, Connolly-Burnham got her breakthrough in the BAFTA nominated CBBC hit drama Wolfblood as Shannon Kelly in which she starred alongside Bobby Lockwood, Aimeé Kelly and Kedar Williams-Sterling. She left the show at the end of season three in 2014.

In 2013, Connolly-Burnham played Willow Jenks in the third season of the Nickelodeon series House of Anubis. In 2014, she starred in the short film Beneath Water in which she was subsequently nominated for Best Actress at the Queens World Film Festival in 2015. Since then, she has appeared as Avril Fox in the 2014 Christmas special of the BBC period drama Call the Midwife. She has also had roles in Holby City (2015), Death in Paradise (2016), Drifters (2016) and Casualty (2016).

Connolly-Burnham made her stage debut playing a leading role in the 2017 theatre production Tribes at the Crucible Theatre. She has also starred in the stage production Beirut in 2018 at The Park Theatre. In 2019, Connolly-Burnham founded her own production company Thimble Films, and made her directorial debut with the short film The Call Centre (2020), which amassed over 1.5 million views on YouTube and earned Connolly-Burnham a nomination for Best Producer at the Underwire Film Festival UK.

Filmography

Film

Television

Video games

Stage

Awards and nominations

References

External links

Living people
1992 births
21st-century English actresses
Actresses from Buckinghamshire
Actresses from the West Midlands (county)
English filmmakers
English people of Irish descent
English people of Italian descent
People educated at Tring Park School for the Performing Arts
People from Solihull